Wilfried Urbain Elvis Endzanga (born March 28, 1980 in Brazzaville, Congo) is a Congolese former footballer who played as a striker for Kawkab Marrakech in the GNF 1.

Early in his career, Endzanga played club football for Étoile du Congo, then managed by his father, Henri. He moved abroad, helping Coton Sport FC de Garoua win its fourth Elite One title in 2003. Endzanga joined JS Kabylie in the winter 2003 transfer window, and helped the club win the 2003–04 Algerian Championnat National.

As his father Henri did, Endzanga played for Republic of the Congo national football team.

Club career
 2000–2002 Étoile du Congo 
 2002–2004 Cotonsport Garoua 
 2004–2005 JS Kabylie 
 2005–2008 USM Blida 
 2008–2009 Kawkab Marrakech

References

External links

1980 births
Republic of the Congo footballers
Republic of the Congo international footballers
Living people
JS Kabylie players
USM Blida players
Expatriate footballers in Morocco
Sportspeople from Brazzaville
Étoile du Congo players
Coton Sport FC de Garoua players
Expatriate footballers in Algeria
Republic of the Congo expatriate sportspeople in Cameroon
Republic of the Congo expatriate sportspeople in Algeria
Republic of the Congo expatriate sportspeople in Morocco
Expatriate footballers in Cameroon
Kawkab Marrakech players
Association football forwards